John Cole's Book Shop (originally John Cole's Book and Craft Shop) was a bookstore in La Jolla, San Diego, California. It was founded in 1946 by John (d. 1959) and Barbara Cole (d. 2004) on Ivanhoe Avenue, and moved in 1966 to the Wisteria Cottage at 780 Prospect Street. The cottage had housed Ellen Browning Scripps' half-sister Virginia, and La Jolla Country Day School, prior to becoming the location of John Cole's Book Shop.  Susan and Charles Cole, the daughter and son of John and Barbara Cole worked in the book shop as did Susan's daughter Trilce and Charles' son Zachary.  Zachary sold harmonicas in the book store.  Parties were held for numerous authors over the years.  The La Jolla Museum of Contemporary Art lent sculptures to John Cole's Book Shop which were displayed on the grounds.

John Cole's Book Shop specialized in books about Mexico, and specifically the Baja Peninsula as well as Mexican art.

Theodor Seuss Geisel, better known as Dr. Seuss, was a close friend of both John and Barbara Cole as early as the 1940s, lived in La Jolla and regularly signed books for the shop.

The shop closed in 2005, and the cottage is to be turned into a museum by the La Jolla Historical Society.

References

Bookstores in California
La Jolla, San Diego
Buildings and structures in San Diego
Independent bookstores of the United States
Retail buildings in California
1946 establishments in California
2005 disestablishments in California
Retail companies established in 1946
Retail companies disestablished in 2005
Companies based in San Diego
Defunct companies based in California